Airtel-Vodafone Limited is a mobile network operator located in Jersey and Guernsey (Channel Islands), and is a joint venture between Bharti Airtel and Vodafone. Airtel-Vodafone was first launched in Jersey in June 2007 and expanded operations to Guernsey in March 2008.

The Red-M coverage survey assessed islandwide coverage of the Airtel-Vodafone mobile network versus the Jersey Telecom and Sure mobile networks for 2G and 3G services. The Red-M results show that for the benchmark threshold for good indoor coverage (signal strength > -81 dBm) for 2G GSM mobile services, Airtel Vodafone's network on average offered 15% better coverage than Jersey Telecom and 14% better than Sure across Jersey.

It is regulated by the Channel Islands Competition and Regulatory Authorities.

See also
 Bharti Airtel
 Vodafone Group
 Telecommunications in Jersey
 List of mobile network operators

References

External links

Bharti Airtel
Vodafone
Companies of Guernsey
Telecommunications companies of Jersey